María Teresa Castañón Silva (born 27 October 1978) is a Chilean politician who served as councillor of Punta Arenas and as intendant of the Magallanes Region and the Chilean Antarctic Territory.

In 2021, she run as candidate for the Constitutional Convention for the 28th District.

References

External Links
 

1978 births
Living people
21st-century Chilean politicians
21st-century Chilean women politicians
National Renewal (Chile) politicians
Santo Tomás University alumni
Intendants of Magallanes Region